Mount Gow is a mountain, measuring in at  of height, on the east side of Rennick Glacier in the Bowers Mountains of Victoria Land, Antarctica. It marks the west end of the rugged heights between the mouths of Carryer Glacier and Sledgers Glacier where these two tributaries enter the nearby Rennick Glacier. This topographical feature was first mapped by the United States Geological Survey from surveys and U.S. Navy air photos, 1960–62, and was named by the Advisory Committee on Antarctic Names for Anthony J. Gow, a veteran Antarctic glaciologist who conducted his scientific research at the Byrd Station, South Pole Station, and McMurdo Station during nearly every Summer season ranging from 1959 to 1969. The mountain lies situated on the Pennell Coast, a portion of Antarctica lying between Cape Williams and Cape Adare.

References

Mountains of Victoria Land
Pennell Coast